Charles Donell "Donnie" Williams (born March 12, 1948) is an American football wide receiver who played one season with the Los Angeles Rams of the National Football League. He was drafted by the Rams in the second round of the 1970 NFL Draft. He played college football for the Prairie View A&M Panthers of Prairie View A&M University. He attended L. G. Pinkston High School in Dallas, Texas.

He played in five games for the Rams in 1970 and caught one pass for nine yards.

References

External links
Just Sports Stats

Living people
1948 births
American football wide receivers
Prairie View A&M Panthers football players
Los Angeles Rams players
Players of American football from Dallas